The Medicare and Medicaid Extenders Act of 2010 is a federal law of the United States, enacted in 2010.  The law was first introduced into the House as H.R. 4994 on April 13, 2010, by Rep. John Lewis (D-GA) with 20 cosponsors. It was then referred to the House Committee on Ways and Means and the House Committee on the Budget.

The bill was signed by President Barack Obama on December 15, 2010, after passing in Congress.

Elements of the law
The law prevented implementation of the 2010 conversion factor for the Medicare Sustainable Growth Rate (SGR).  The SGR determines how much money Medicare will pay physicians and other health care providers for health services.  Pursuant to this law, the SGR will not be modified until January 1, 2012.

References

External links 
 , Legislative History

Medicare and Medicaid (United States)
United States federal health legislation
Acts of the 111th United States Congress